Cuba Cabana is a 1952 West German drama film directed by Fritz Peter Buch and starring Zarah Leander, O.W. Fischer and Paul Hartmann. It was the second film of an early 1950s comeback for Leander, who had been a major star during the Nazi era. The film was based on a story by Tibor Yost. It was shot at the Bavaria Studios in Munich and on locarion in Madrid, Barcelona, Sevilla and Malga. The film's sets were designed by the art directors Bruno Monden and Hermann Warm.

Cast
 Zarah Leander as Arabella
 O.W. Fischer as Robby Tomsen
 Paul Hartmann as Gouverneur
 Hans Richter as Billy
 Eduard Linkers as Honneg
 Karl Meixner as Pandulkar
 Nicolas Koline as Jose
 Werner Lieven as Pedro
 Peter Elsholtz as Polizeikommissar
 John Pauls-Harding as Adjutant
 Hans Holten as Gomez
 Harald Mannl as Chefredakteur
 Karl Kreuzer as Inspizient
 Karl-Heinz Peters as Kriminalbeamter
 Heinz Kargus as Filippo
 Willy Rösner as Kapitän
 Gérard Tichy as Polizei-Oberst

References

Bibliography 
 Marshall, Bill & Stillwell, Jeananne. Musicals: Hollywood and Beyond. Intellect Books, 2000.

External links 
 

1952 films
West German films
German drama films
1952 drama films
1950s German-language films
Films directed by Fritz Peter Buch
Films set in South America
German black-and-white films
1950s German films
Films shot in Spain
Films shot at Bavaria Studios